The 2008 J.League Division 1 season is the 44th season of the top-flight club football in Japan and the 16th season since the establishment of J1 League. The season began on March 8 and ended on December 6.

A total of eighteen clubs participated in double round-robin format.  Starting this season, top three clubs received automatic qualification to the following years' AFC Champions League.  The bottom two clubs were relegated to J2 League by default, while 16th-placed club had to defend their spot in the top-flight in the pro/rele series.

Clubs

Following eighteen clubs played in J.League Division 1 during 2008 season.  Of these clubs, Consadole Sapporo, Tokyo Verdy, and Kyoto Sanga FC are newly promoted clubs.

Format
Eighteen clubs will play in double round-robin (home and away) format, a total of 34 games each. A club receives 3 points for a win, 1 point for a tie, and 0 points for a loss. The clubs are ranked by points, and tie breakers are, in the following order:
 Goal differential
 Goals scored
 Head-to-head results
 Disciplinary points
A draw would be conducted, if necessary.  However, if two clubs are tied at the first place, both clubs will be declared as the champions. The bottom two clubs will be relegated to J2, while the 16th placed club plays a two-legged Promotion/relegation Series.  The champions of this season qualifies to the AFC Champions League and one to three more clubs may also qualify.
Changes from Previous Year
 Introduction of Disciplinary points for tie breaker (2008–)
 Top three clubs will qualify to AFC Champions League
 The J.League will not qualify to the abolished A3 Champions Cup.

Table

Results

Top scorers

Assists

Awards

Individual Awards

Best Eleven

Attendance

References

External links
 J. League Official Site (English)

J1 League seasons
1
Japan
Japan